Chehel Amiran (also Romanized as Chehel Amīrān; also known as Chīleh Mīrān and Chilleh Mīrān) is a village in Howmeh Rural District, in the Central District of Bijar County, Kurdistan Province, Iran. At the 2006 census, its population was 38, in 12 families. The village is populated by Kurds.

References 

Towns and villages in Bijar County
Kurdish settlements in Kurdistan Province